The Canadian Action Party (CAP) (PAC) was a Canadian federal political party founded in 1997 and deregistered on 31 March 2017.

The party stood for Canadian nationalism, monetary and electoral reform, and opposed liberal globalization and free trade agreements that had been signed by the Canadian government.

History 
The Canadian Action Party (CAP) was founded by Paul T. Hellyer, a former Liberal minister of national defence in the cabinet of Lester B. Pearson.  Hellyer ran unsuccessfully for the leadership of the Liberal Party in 1968, and for the leadership of the Progressive Conservative Party in 1976.

CAP nominated candidates for the first time in the 1997 federal election.

After the 1997 election, it absorbed the Canada Party, another minor party concerned about monetary reform which had been formed by former members of the Social Credit Party of Canada. Former Canada Party leader Claire Foss served as vice president of CAP until November 2003.

Hellyer resigned as CAP leader in 2003 after the New Democratic Party (NDP) didn't agree to a merger proposal, under which the NDP would change its name. In 2004, Connie Fogal, an activist lawyer, was acclaimed party leader after David Orchard failed to respond to an invitation to take over the leadership. Fogal stepped down in 2008 and was succeeded by Andrew J. Moulden following the 2008 federal election.

The acting chief electoral officer of Canada advised the party leader that the party will be deregistered effective Friday, March 31, 2017, for not having at least 250 members who are eligible voters.

Positions 

A number of CAP members also belonged to the Committee on Monetary and Economic Reform and had been influential in developing CAP's monetary policy, particularly its position that the Bank of Canada, rather than chartered banks, should provide loans to the government, if required, to fund public spending.

CAP also argued for the abrogation of the North American Free Trade Agreement, and opposed current government trade initiatives and any legislation leading to the Free Trade Area of the Americas, Trans-Pacific Partnership and what it saw as integration with the United States and Mexico into a North American Union.

Federal leaders 
Shown by default in chronological order of leadership

Presidents 
Shown by default in chronological order of leadership

Electoral results

See also

A Program for Monetary Reform
Alter-globalization
American Monetary Institute
Canadian Action Party candidates, 2006 Canadian federal election
Canadian Action Party candidates, 2004 Canadian federal election
Canadian Action Party candidates, 2000 Canadian federal election
Canadian Action Party candidates, 1997 Canadian federal election
Canadian social credit movement
Chicago plan
Committee on Monetary and Economic Reform
List of political parties in Canada
National Advancement Party of Canada
Social credit
The Chicago Plan Revisited

References

External links
ActionParty.ca - current website
CAP blog site
Old official website - Web Archive
Canadian Action Party I- Canadian Political Parties and Political Interest Groups - Web Archive created by the University of Toronto Libraries
Canadian Action Party II - Canadian Political Parties and Political Interest Groups - Web Archive created by the University of Toronto Libraries

Civic nationalism
Political parties established in 1997
Anti-globalization political parties
2017 disestablishments in Canada
Federal political parties in Canada
Left-wing nationalist parties
Monetary reformers
Monetary reform
Nationalist parties in Canada
Political parties disestablished in 2017
Protectionism
Social democratic parties in Canada